Foroohar may refer to: 
Rana Foroohar (born 1970), American journalist
Faravahar, symbol of Iran and Zoroastrianism